Culture Ireland is the Irish State Agency established to promote and advance Irish Arts internationally.  It was set up in 2005 and is funded by the Department of Tourism, Culture, Arts, Gaeltacht, Sport and Media.  Its budget for 2010 was €4.083m.  The specific activities of Culture Ireland include:
 Funding Irish artists or arts organisations to support Irish cultural activities of excellence
 Funding and facilitating Irish participation at strategic international arts events
 Managing of special ('emblematic') cultural and artistic events
 Advising to the Minister for Arts, Sport and Tourism (currently, Tom Iles) on international arts and cultural affairs

See also
 Arts Council of Ireland
 Culture of Ireland

References

External links
 Culture Ireland Official Website

Irish culture
Arts councils
Arts in Ireland
Government agencies of the Republic of Ireland
Cultural promotion organizations